Bonesteel is a city in Gregory County, South Dakota, United States. The population was 258 at the 2020 census.

History
Bonesteel was laid out in 1902. The city named for H. E. Bonesteel, who operated as a freight forwarder in the area.

Geography

Bonesteel is located at  (43.077044, -98.946858).

Bonesteel has been assigned the ZIP code 57317, and the FIPS place code 06220.

Demographics

2010 census
As of the census of 2010, there were 275 people, 125 households, and 74 families residing in the city. The racial makeup of the city was 73.5% White, 22.9% Native American, 1.8% from other races, and 1.8% from two or more races. Hispanic or Latino of any race were 4.0% of the population.

There were 125 households, of which 24.8% had children under the age of 18 living with them, 47.2% were married couples living together, 9.6% had a female householder with no husband present, 2.4% had a male householder with no wife present, and 40.8% were non-families. 38.4% of all households were made up of individuals, and 20% had someone living alone who was 65 years of age or older. The average household size was 2.20 and the average family size was 2.88.

The median age in the city was 49.8 years. 26.5% of residents were under the age of 18; 2.6% were between the ages of 18 and 24; 18.1% were from 25 to 44; 22.5% were from 45 to 64; and 30.2% were 65 years of age or older. The gender makeup of the city was 48.0% male and 52.0% female.

2000 census
As of the census of 2000, there were 297 people, 137 households, and 90 families residing in the city. The population density was 863.1 people per square mile (337.3/km2). There were 164 housing units at an average density of 476.6 per square mile (186.2/km2). The racial makeup of the city was 90.57% White, 7.07% Native American, and 2.36% from two or more races. Hispanic or Latino of any race were 0.34% of the population.

There were 137 households, out of which 21.9% had children under the age of 18 living with them, 53.3% were married couples living together, 6.6% had a female householder with no husband present, and 34.3% were non-families. 33.6% of all households were made up of individuals, and 23.4% had someone living alone who was 65 years of age or older. The average household size was 2.09 and the average family size was 2.53.

In the city, the population was spread out, with 18.5% under the age of 18, 5.1% from 18 to 24, 16.5% from 25 to 44, 26.3% from 45 to 64, and 33.7% who were 65 years of age or older. The median age was 54 years. For every 100 females, there were 96.7 males. For every 100 females age 18 and over, there were 90.6 males.

The median income for a household in the city was $26,389, and the median income for a family was $30,833. Males had a median income of $21,500 versus $21,250 for females. The per capita income for the city was $13,621. About 8.0% of families and 14.6% of the population were below the poverty line, including 17.6% of those under the age of eighteen and 17.3% of those 65 or over.

Climate
This climatic region is typified by large seasonal temperature differences, with warm to hot (and often humid) summers and cold (sometimes severely cold) winters.  According to the Köppen Climate Classification system, Bonesteel has a humid continental climate, abbreviated "Dfa" on climate maps.

References

External links
The Battle of Bonesteel via waymarking.com  (archived copy available)
The Battle of Bonesteel via lisarivero.com  (archived copy available)
Bonesteel article via southdakotamagazine.com  (archived copy available)
City of Bonesteel Facebook page
The Bonesteel Enterprise  Local newspaper, est. 1901
Bonesteel photo gallery via tripod.com  (archived copy available)
Bonesteel photos via flickr.com

Cities in South Dakota
Cities in Gregory County, South Dakota